Palmyra Township is one of ten townships in Knox County, Indiana. As of the 2010 census, its population was 1,466 and it contained 612 housing units.

History
Shadowwood was added to the National Register of Historic Places in 2001. Rose Hill Farmstead was formerly listed.

Geography

References

External links
 Indiana Township Association
 United Township Association of Indiana

Townships in Knox County, Indiana
Townships in Indiana